Almere may refer to:

Almere, a town in the Netherlands
Almere Buiten, a district in Almere
Almere Haven, the oldest part of Almere
Almere Poort, a new district in Almere
Almere Stad, a district in Almere
Almere (lake), an early medieval name for the Zuiderzee

See also
Almer (disambiguation)